Chesapeake Arboretum (48 acres) is a non-profit arboretum located at 624 Oak Grove Road, Chesapeake, Virginia. It is open daily without charge.

The arboretum was established in 1996, and currently consists of a mature hardwood forest with good trail system, farmhouse, and theme and demonstration gardens. 

The Chesapeake Arboretum trail system is approximately 45 acres and is some 3.5 miles (5.6 km) in total length.  

A perennial stream, Starr Run, runs through the trail system and is crossed by 11 bridges.

See also 
 List of botanical gardens in the United States

References

External links 
 Chesapeake Arboretum

Arboreta in Virginia
Botanical gardens in Virginia
1996 establishments in Virginia
Protected areas of Chesapeake, Virginia
Protected areas established in 1996